The 12″ Album is an album of 12-inch mixes by singer and musician Howard Jones, released in November 1984. It was released between the first two studio albums Human's Lib and Dream into Action and at the time was the only album to feature the single "Like to Get to Know You Well", which had been a hit four months earlier.

The album reached number 15 in the UK Album Charts and was certified Gold.

Track listing
"Always Asking Questions" (4:27) 
"New Song" (New Version) (5:23) 
"What Is Love" (Extended Mix) (6:34) 
"Like to Get to Know You Well" (International Mix) (7:35) 
"Pearl in the Shell" (Extended Mix) (6:44) 
"Total Conditioning" (6:58)

Mixed by Stephen W Tayler

Charts

Certifications

References

External links

Howard Jones (English musician) albums
1984 remix albums
Elektra Records remix albums